The United Reformed Church Youth is the umbrella organisation for young people aged 11–25 within the United Reformed Church.

Formed in 1974 as FURY. It was led by an Advisory Board elected at the annual FURY Assembly. Between 2013 and 2016 FURY underwent a restructuring becoming the United Reformed Church Youth.

Events

 FURY Assembly- event run annually up to and including 2011 in January for all young people in the URC, this was superseded by URC Youth Assembly in 2012.

Youth Assembly Moderators

References 

United Reformed Church